The 2027 Rugby World Cup is scheduled to be the eleventh edition of the Rugby World Cup, the quadrennial world championship for men's rugby union teams. It is scheduled to take place in Australia in 2027.

Development and preparations

Australia won their bid to host the 2027 Rugby World Cup on 12 May 2022.

Venues

Twelve venues in nine cities have been shortlisted for hosting the tournament.

Qualifying

A total of 12 teams will gain automatic qualification for the tournament by finishing in the top three of their pool at the 2023 Rugby World Cup

The below table shows the qualified teams as of 28 April 2022:

Bidding

World Rugby is hoping to award the bids for both the 2027 and 2031 men's World Cups (along with the bids for the 2025 and 2029 women's World Cups) by May 2022. The process of talking to prospective nations began in February 2021 with the formal candidate process commencing three months later. Finalists will be evaluated in February 2022.

As of June 2019, Argentina, Australia and Russia had declared their interest in hosting the 2027 Rugby World Cup, but Argentina withdrew their bid in April 2020, leaving two bidders. There was speculation that the United States and South Africa would be interested in hosting the event, but the South African Rugby Union has stated that it would not be bidding for the 2027 World Cup.

World Rugby chairman Bill Beaumont suggested in late 2018 that the host of the Rugby World Cup following the 2023 event in France could be an emerging nation. World Rugby CEO Brett Gosper also suggested in 2019 that World Rugby may bid the 2027 and 2031 World Cups together (as they did with England 2015 and Japan 2019), so that they could make “a bolder decision and a traditional decision.” The hosts for the 2027 and 2031 tournaments will be revealed in May 2022.

The fact that three consecutive World Cups (England 2015, Japan 2019, and France 2023) will have occurred in the northern hemisphere made the southern hemisphere countries considered the favourites.

On 12 May 2022, it was announced that Australia would host the 2027 Rugby World Cup.

Announced bidders

Australia
Rugby Australia announced on 13 December 2017 that Australia would bid for the 2027 Rugby World Cup. Australia has previously hosted the 1987 Rugby World Cup together with New Zealand, as well as the 2003 Rugby World Cup on its own.

Withdrawn bids

Argentina

Argentina had announced on 5 October 2016 that it would bid for the 2027 Rugby World Cup, but withdrew its bid in April 2020. Argentina has never hosted the tournament before, and World Rugby chairman Bill Beaumont had pledged that he would back the right of countries such as Argentina to bid for the event. Argentina is the only country to reach the World Cup semi-finals that has not hosted any World Cup matches. In April 2020, Argentina withdrew its bid to strengthen the Australian bid, making Australia favourites for the 2027 Rugby World Cup host.

Russia
Stanislav Druzhinin of the Russian Rugby Union said at a meeting on 31 May 2019 that Russia would apply to host the 2027 Rugby World Cup. Russia would use the 2018 FIFA World Cup stadiums and legacy for the 2027 Rugby World Cup. President Vladimir Putin backed Russia's bid to host the 2027 Rugby World Cup.

Rugby Union of Russia could not proceed with its bid to host after Court of Arbitration for Sport imposed a two-year ban on 17 December 2020 on Russia hosting any major sports tournament.

References

 
2027 in rugby union
2027
World Cup 2027
World Cup
2027 in Australian rugby union